Miróbriga (Mirobriga Celticorum)  is an ancient Roman town located near the village and civil parish of Santiago do Cacém, in the municipality of the same name in the south-west of Portugal. Archeology revealed that the town occupied the site of an ancient Iron Age settlement that existed since the 9th century B.C.

With the Roman colonization, a commercial area developed around the Forum. The Thermae, among the best preserved in Portugal, consist of two adjoining buildings, possibly for male and female use respectively. The residential areas are still little known. Relatively close to the baths, there is a bridge with a single semicircular arch. The Hippodrome, the only one whose entire ground plan is completely known in Portugal, is located further from the centre.

History

Excavations and investigations (W. Biers, 1988), suggest that the earliest settlement began to take shape in the 9th century BC. (Iron Age), and that the defensive walls began appearing between the 4th–3rd century BC. This settlement occupied an area of 11,800 m2, with the population inhabiting the area along the embankment and north-east corner of Castelo Velho, of which only a wall and temple remains (alongside the Roman forum).

By about the second half of the 1st century Roman occupation began, expanding the site and occupying an area of 28,000 m2. At this time the thermal baths and paved road along the southeast were constructed, reflecting the Flavian economic prosperity. Around the first half of the 2nd century, the construction of the Oriental baths and hippodrome was begun, followed by the second phase of construction in the second half of the 2nd century and 3rd century.

Around the second half of the 2nd century, there were signs of abandon, that may reflect the period of political crisis caused by barbarian invasions during this period. By the end of the 4th century, there is a marked reduction in the population, although a level of continuity persisted on the site: primarily around the small Chapel of São Brás.

The ruins were rediscovered and referenced by André de Resende in the 16th century, but they were never fully studied until the 18th century.

On 1 June 1992, the Instituto Português do Património Arquitectónico (IPPAR) (forerunner of Institute for the Management of Architectural and Archaeological Heritage took over the management of the site, by Decree-Law No.106F/92. This was followed in 1996-1997 by the acquisition of the lands that surrounded the site, as part of the ZEP-Zona de Protecção Especial (Special Protection Zone) designation. On 1 February 1999, a dispatch (No.180/99) from the Ministries of Equipment, Planning and Territory Administration, Ministry of the Environment and the Ministry of Culture, recognized the importance of safeguarding the Roman ruins, and authorized the construction of an Interpretative Centre. The project began in 2000, in a project designed by architect Paula Santos, that included a 700 m2 space.

Architecture

Castelo Velho hill (245 metres) dominates the site that is one kilometre north-west from the urban centre of modern Santiago do Cacém, which overlooks the northern plain of Chãos Salgados. Miróbriga is situated in a privileged location, on the ancient roadways of the region with access to the coast. Within close proximity is the Windmill of Cumeadas.

Forum
To the east of the baths is a small, single-arch bridge, that provided access along the west–east access that leads to the Forum, an Imperial temple (to worship the Roman Emperors) and a temple dedicated to Venus. Between these two are the remains of an older temple dedicated to the local divinity. North of the forum are the ruins of the market and the visitor's houses, separated by another road.

Baths

The settlement is structured around Roman roads with many paved accesses. Around the west–east axis are the ruins of the residential homes. To the east, are the former baths constructed over a canal and composed of two buildings in a "L" shape ("Western Baths" and "Eastern Baths"). Each building has an entry into the massage hall, a gymnasium, changing room, the bathing space, which included the frigidarium (cold baths,  tepidarium (warm baths) and caldarium (hot baths), and a communal latrine. The halls are warmed by a hypocaust system that heated the floors of baths, which was located in the south part of the buildings. It was a subterranean system formed by pillars and arches, with tile, that allowed the circulation of warm air to produce heated environments, supported by kilns.

Hippodrome
The Hippodrome was a rectangular space with curved seating on the northern end, while segmented seat on the south, used for chariot or horse races. It was a 370 metre by 75 metre space, bisected by a spine with posts on either end and a triumphal arch on the south entrance.

Interpretative Centre
The Interpretative Centre (the most recent addition) is located on an elevated area at the entrance to the site, with several paths leading away from this site into the ruins.

Gallery

See also
Lusitania
Sines (the bay of Sines was used as port by the civitas of Mirobriga)

References
Notes

Sources
 
 
 
  Barata, Maria Filomena, 1997, Miróbriga - Arquitectura e urbanismo (tese de mestrado apresentada na Faculdade de Letras do Porto)in https://www.academia.edu/807569/Mirobriga_Arquitectura_e_Urbanismo; Barata, Maria Filomena, Roteiro das Ruínas de Miróbriga (IPPAR)

External links
  360° Portugal Miróbriga ruins
  Miróbriga Blogspot - apontamentos e sentidos com Miróbriga e o Alentejo de fundo

Roman towns and cities in Portugal
Buildings and structures in Setúbal District
Tourist attractions in Setúbal District
Museums of ancient Rome in Portugal
Buildings and structures in Santiago do Cacém